Opalimosina is a subgenus of flies belonging to the family Sphaeroceridae.

Species
O. australis Hayashi, 2009
O. calcarifera (Roháček, 1975)
O. collini (Richards, 1929)
O. dolichodasys Hayashi, 2010
O. mirabilis (Collin, 1902)
O. monticola Hayashi, 2010
O. pseudomirabilis Hayashi, 1989
O. simplex (Richards, 1929)
O. spathulata Hayashi, 2010
O. stepheni Papp, 1991

References

Sphaeroceridae
Diptera of Asia
Diptera of Europe
Diptera of South America
Diptera of North America
Diptera of Australasia
Insect subgenera